India competed at the 2016 Winter Youth Olympics in Lillehammer, Norway from 12 to 21 February 2016.

Alpine skiing

Boys

See also
India at the 2016 Summer Olympics

References

Nations at the 2016 Winter Youth Olympics
India at the Youth Olympics
2016 in Indian sport